Eyes Don't Lie is a full-length album by Donny Osmond, his eleventh solo studio album.  Released on 30 October 1990 on the Capitol label, it peaked at 177 on the Billboard 200 album chart.

The album featured three singles, two of which made Billboard's Hot 100 chart: "My Love Is A Fire" that reached number 21 and "Sure Lookin'" that reached number 54. The last single "Love Will Survive" peaked at number 24 on the Billboard Adult Contemporary Chart.

Track listing
"My Love Is a Fire" (Carl Sturken, Evan Rogers) – 4:28
"Eyes Don't Lie" (Donny Osmond, Carl Sturken, Evan Rogers) – 4:24
"Love Will Survive" (Donny Osmond, Carl Sturken, Evan Rogers) – 5:27
"Sure Lookin (Donny Osmond, David Gamson, Tony LeMans) – 4:22
"Private Affair" (Diane Warren) – 3:49
"Take Another Try (At Love)" (Donny Osmond, David Gamson, Tony LeMans) – 4:27
"Make It Last Forever" (Donny Osmond, Mark Holding, Mark Mancina) – 5:25
"Never Too Late For Love" (Donny Osmond, Carl Sturken, Evan Rogers) – 5:26
"Just Between You and Me" (Donny Osmond, Duane Hitchings, Alan Hewitt) – 3:46
"Before It's Too Late" (Donny Osmond, Oliver Leiber, David Gamson) – 5:18

Track publishing
Track 1 Copyright Warner-Tamerlane Music/Bayjun Beat Music/Green Lantern Music.  Tracks 2, 3, & 8 Copyright My Idumea Music-Virgin Music/Warner-Tamerlane Music/Bayjun Beat Music/Green Lantern Music.  Tracks 4 & 6 Copyright My Idumea Music-Virgin Music/WB Music Corp/Gamson Songs/LeMans Music.  Track 5 Copyright RealSongs.  Track 7 Copyright My Idumea Music-Virgin Music/Mark I. Holding Music/Ocheltree Music/Mark A. Mancina Music.  Track 9 Copyright My Idumea Music-Virgin Music/Hitchings Music/Editions EG/Don Tina Music.  Track 10 Copyright My Idumea Music-Virgin Music/Oliver Leiber Music/Virgin Music/Gamson Songs/WB Music Corp.

Production and personnel
Tracks 1-3 & 8 Produced by Carl Sturken & Evan Rogers.  Track 1 Engineered by Al Hemburger & Matt Noble; Tracks 2, 3 & 8 Engineered by Al Hemburger, Matt Noble & Acar Key.  Engineering Assistance on all tracks by Ed Murphy.  Mixed by Steve Peck, Electric Lady Studios.
All Instruments on Tracks 1 & 8 by Carl Sturken.
Musicians On Tracks 2 & 3 - Carl Sturken: Guitars, Keyboards; John "Noodle" Nevin: Bass; Dave Koz: Saxophone On Track 3
Tracks 4, 6, 7 & 10 Produced by David Gamson. Tracks 4 & 6 Engineered by Stephen Shelton, Ryan Dorn & Ray Bardani.  Tracks 7 & 10 Engineered by Ryan Dorn & Ray Bardani.  Mixed by Ray Bardani & Ryan Dorn.
David Gamson: Keyboards & Drum Programming; Paul Jackson, Jr.: Guitars (Tracks 7 & 10); Paulinho da Costa: Percussion (track 10); Cornelius Mims: Bass (Track 6); Oliver Leiber: Additional Drum Programming (Track 10); Michael Brecker: Saxophone (Track 6); DJ Aladdin: Scratching (Track 6); Strings On Track 10 Arranged & Conducted by Jeremy Lubbock; Contracted by Jules Chalkin.
Track 5 Produced by Ric Wake (For Wake Productions); Arranged by Ric Wake & Rich Tancredi. Engineered & Mixed by Bob Cadway, with assistance from  Dan Hetzel & Tom Yezzi.
Rich Tancredi: Keyboards; Joe Franco: Drums, Percussion; Billy T. Scott, Jamillah Muhammed & Shelly Peiken: Vocal Backing
Track 9 Arranged & Produced by Ric Wake & Donny Osmond.  Engineered & Mixed by Bob Cadway & Ryan Dorn.
Joe Franco: Drums, Percussion; Rich Tancredi: Keyboards; Al Pitrelli: Rhythm Guitar; Rory James Collen: Lead Guitar
Strings On Track 10 - Bruce Dukov, Debra Price, Arnold Belnick, Isabelle Daskoff, Joel Derouin, Henry Ferber, Reg Hill, Brian Leonard, Gordon Marron, Don Palmer, Haim Shtrum, Bob Sushel, Mari Tsumura, Shari Zippert: Violins; Fred Seykora, Ron Cooper, Larry Corbett, Ernie Ehrhradt, Dennis Karmazyn, Suzie Katayama: Celli; Sam Boghossian, Ken Burward-Hoy, Myra Kestenbaum, Dan Neufeld: Viola
Album Mastered by Stephen Marcussen at Precision Lacquer, Los Angeles

Reception
Charlotte Dillon of Allmusic gave the album 3 stars out of a possible 5, writing that the album was "worth a listen" due Osmond's vocal talents

Album cover differences

The Vinyl LP release features the artist name in green and album title with a green drop shadow.
The cassette release features the artist name in orange and album title with an orange drop shadow.
The CD release features the artist name in light blue and album title with a light blue drop shadow.

References

Donny Osmond: "Eyes Don't Lie" CD Booklet.  1990 Capitol Records.

1990 albums
Donny Osmond albums
Capitol Records albums
Albums produced by Carl Sturken and Evan Rogers
Albums produced by Ric Wake